Nesiodostomia montforti is a species of sea snail, a marine gastropod mollusk in the family Pyramidellidae, the pyrams and their allies.

Nesiodostomia montforti as a replacement name for Odostomia secunda, itself a synonym of Eulimella secunda (Pilsbry, 1918)

References

External links
 To World Register of Marine Species
 Sea Slugs of Hawaii : Eulimella secunda

Pyramidellidae
Gastropods described in 1972